The Socialist Equality Party (SGP) is a minor Trotskyist political party in Germany.

History
It was founded in 1971 as the Federation of Socialist Workers by West German supporters of Gerry Healy's Socialist Labour League and was renamed the Party for Social Equality, Section of the Fourth International (PSG) in 1997.

On 18–19 February 2017, the party adopted its present name.

Ideology
The party sees itself as the German section of the Fourth International in the tradition of Leon Trotsky. The international umbrella group of the party is the International Committee of the Fourth International (ICFI). It has contacts to other member parties of the ICFI in England, the US, Sri Lanka, France, Canada and Australia.

The SGP is critical of trade unions (which it views as merely a tool of the labour aristocracy), social democrats, and Stalinist organisations. The party takes an anti-nationalist and anti-capitalist stance. It supports the introduction of universal basic income.

The SGP is classified as a left-wing extremist organization by the Federal Office for the Protection of the Constitution (BfV) and is as such under observation.

Election results

Bundestag

See also
International Socialist Organisation (Germany)
Socialist Alternative (Germany)
Workers' Power (Germany)

Notes

References

Further reading
The Historical Foundations of the Partei fur Soziale Gleichheit, Mehring Books 2011,  (Online)

External links
Official website of the party
Online publication of the party: world socialist website - wsws.org

1997 establishments in Germany
Communist parties in Germany
International Committee of the Fourth International
Political parties established in 1997
Trotskyist organisations in Germany
Universal basic income in Germany
Political parties supporting universal basic income